Don't Run Away may refer to:

 "Don't Run Away" (Sandie Shaw song), a 1968 song by Sandie Shaw
 "Don't Run Away", a song by David Archuleta from the 2013 album No Matter How Far
 "Don't Run Away", a song by Antonina Armato from the 2012 soundtrack album Let It Shine
 "Don't Run Away", a song by Honeyz appearing as B-side on "End of the Line"
 Don't Run Away (program), a program by StandUp for Kids educating elementary and middle school students about the consequences and alternatives of running away

See also 
 "Ne t'enfuis pas", a song by Kate Bush with title meaning don't run away in French